"In Waves" is the first single from American heavy metal band Trivium's fifth studio album by the same name. This song was released on May 21, 2011. It is the first single to feature drummer Nick Augusto, and it has a different sound than Trivium's previous singles. It reached 31 on the UK Rock Chart.

Music video 
The song's video was directed by Ramon Boutviseth (Dream Theater, All That Remains) and shows the band exploring a strange "swamp like" place. There is no performance in the video and it is extended to seven minutes. It is the first of a series of videos followed by the next single Built to Fall from the same album. Along with the rest of the songs from the album a live performance of the song from Chapman Studios was released.

Personnel 
Matt Heafy – lead vocals, guitars
Corey Beaulieu – guitars, backing vocals
Paolo Gregoletto – bass guitar, backing vocals
Nick Augusto – drums, percussion

References

External links 
  Official music video

Trivium (band) songs
2011 singles
2011 songs
Roadrunner Records singles
Songs written by Matt Heafy
Songs written by Corey Beaulieu
Songs written by Paolo Gregoletto